Julien Donkey-Boy is a 1999 American experimental drama film written and directed by Harmony Korine. The story concentrates on Julien, a man with schizophrenia, played by Scottish actor Ewen Bremner, and his dysfunctional family. The film also stars Chloë Sevigny as Julien's sister, Pearl, and Werner Herzog as his father. Julien Donkey-Boy was the sixth film to be made under the self-imposed rules of the Dogme 95 manifesto, and the first non-European film to be made under the Dogme 95 "vow of chastity".

Plot
Julien, a young man with untreated schizophrenia, meets a young boy playing with several turtles in a New York City park. Fascinated by the turtles, Julien asks if he can have one. When he is denied, he strangles the boy, then buries his body in the mud before praying for mercy from God.
 
At home, Julien resides with his dysfunctional family, consisting of his domineering and emotionless German father; his childlike pregnant sister Pearl (whose child may be Julien's); his younger brother, Chris, an aspiring wrestler who spends his days exercising and practicing wrestling moves; and their paternal grandmother, who is largely disconnected from the rest of the family.

The family's father spends the majority of his time recounting national historical narratives, drinking, and inflicting psychological and physical abuse on Chris. During one of Chris's exercise sessions, his father forces him outside in the cold and hoses him down with water. He also pines for his deceased wife, going so far as begging Chris to wear his mother's wedding dress and dance with him. Meanwhile, Julien works as a teacher's aide at a school for the blind. Julien spends most of his spare time going to confession, muttering to himself on the streets, and imagining conversations with Adolf Hitler.

Julien is also riddled with grief over his mother's death, and Pearl sometimes soothes him by pretending to be their mother on the telephone. Pearl spends most of her days searching for baby clothes for her soon-to-be-born child, and making lists of her favorite baby names. Searching for other hobbies, she decides to take up learning to play the harp. Chris compulsively practices wrestling moves on trash cans, and sometimes incites matches with Julien. Their father recounts historical stories, lambasts Julien and Pearl for "artsy-fartsy" poetry and being "a dilettante and a slut" respectively, and pines for his dead wife.

Julien and Pearl accompany their father to a local Baptist church, where the sermon has a profound impact on Julien. Some time later, Pearl and Julien spend a day together going ice skating at an indoor skating rink. Julien tries to sell some homemade skates to a Hasidic boy and Pearl takes to the ice despite being heavily pregnant. She trips, landing on her abdomen and causing a miscarriage. At the hospital, Julien convinces a nurse to let him hold the baby, saying it is his. She allows it, but while alone with the baby, Julien escapes home on a bus. Julien goes to his room, hides under the blankets, cradles the baby and mutters prayers.

Cast

Production
Julien Donkey-Boy was the first American film made in accordance with the Danish filmmaking collective Dogme 95. Shot in New York on MiniDV tape, the film was transferred to 16mm film before being blown up to 35mm film for the master print. Korine used this method to give the film a low-definition, grainy aesthetic. Much of the actors' dialogue was improvised.

The film utilizes several cinematographic styles, including stop-motion photography, parallel cuts, and still photographs in order to tell its story.

The film’s budget of $1.5 million was mostly spent on travel and work visas for Werner and Ewen, as well as post-production in Denmark.

Dogme 95
Korine broke a few of the Dogme 95 rules in making the film. Dogme 95's tenets stipulate all the camerawork must be handheld, but this film uses hidden cameras that are technically not handheld. There is also the use of non-diegetic music (Oval's "Mediation" from Systemisch in the ice-skating scene, same group's "Shop In Store" from 94 Diskont). Finally, the film breaks the rule that the director must not be credited; however, the film only displays Harmony Korine's name and not an official director title.

Despite these transgressions, the original Dogme 95 committee endorsed Julien Donkey-Boy. In an interview on the Epidemic DVD, Lars Von Trier, Dogme 95 co-creator, lauded Korine's ability to interpret the rules creatively.

Release
The film premiered at the Venice Film Festival in September 1999. It received a limited release in Los Angeles at a single cinema on October 15, 1999; the film showed for a month's time at the Los Angeles Theatre, and grossed a total of $80.226 by that November. It was given a wide theatrical release in European countries the following year, particularly in France and the Netherlands. The film grossed $85,400 domestically and $7,042 in other countries for a worldwide total of $92,442.

Critical reception
Julien Donkey-Boy currently holds a 29% rating on Rotten Tomatoes based on 38 reviews, with an average rating of 5.3 out of 10. The website's critical consensus reads, "Director Harmony Korine takes a big stylistic swing that will miss with most audiences, producing an unfocused and mean-spirited art film with a bitter aftertaste." The film has a weighted average score of 52/100 on Metacritic based on 23 reviews, indicating "mixed or average reviews".

Empire Magazine said that "Despite some creditable performances, Korine's bizarre, shambling direction renders the result less ground-breakingly experimental than rectum-numbingly dull." Edward Guthmann of the San Francisco Chronicle called the film "A self-indulgent mess."

Despite a sense of negative reaction to Julien Donkey-Boy, it was praised by some critics. Kevin Thomas of the Los Angeles Times gave the film a positive review, saying the film attained a "depth of compassion and understanding ... [it] acquires a spiritual dimension that allows it ultimately to become an act of redemption". Lisa Schwarzbaum from Entertainment Weekly awarded the film a score of B+, describing the film as "an exciting artistic leap", while writing that "Korine — working with cinematographer Anthony Dod Mantle, who shot the Dogma breakthrough The Celebration — discovers visual ways to convey emotional terrain that will serve him well, I hope, even after he outgrows shock as an artistic goal."

Additional praise for the film came from Chicago Sun Times film critic Roger Ebert, who gave the film 3/4 stars, saying that "[The film] adds up to something, unlike a lot of movies where individual shots are sensational, but they add up to nothing"; Ebert did, however, note that the film had a very limited audience: "The odds are good that most people will dislike this film and be offended by it. For others, it will provoke sympathy rather than scorn. You know who you are".

References

External links

 
 
 

1999 films
1999 drama films
American drama films
Films directed by Harmony Korine
Camcorder films
Dogme 95 films
Films about dysfunctional families
Works about dysfunctional families
Films set in New York (state)
Films shot in New York (state)
Incest in film
American independent films
1999 independent films
Fictional portrayals of schizophrenia
1990s English-language films
1990s American films